Hoges: The Paul Hogan Story is a two-part Australian miniseries based on Australian actor and comedian Paul Hogan which premiered on 12 February and concluded on 19 February 2017.

Plot

The story of Paul Hogan is that of almost accidental supernova of raw comedic talent exploding onto the entertainment scene of first Australia and then the world. How a married-at-eighteen blue-collar worker with five kids went on talent contest New Faces as a dare from his work-mates and ended up completely wowing the audience and opening the door to completely unanticipated new life.

Production

The series was announced in November 2015 with filming expected to be filmed in 2016, in December 2015, it was announced casting was underway and Kevin Carlin would direct the series with Keith Thompson and Marieke Hardy as lead writers. In May 2016, the cast for the series was announced with actor Josh Lawson taking on the role of Paul Hogan. Production for the series first began in May 2016 with filming taking place in Brisbane, the series is being funded by Screen Queensland.

Cast

 Josh Lawson as Paul Hogan
 Sean Keenan as Young Paul
 Justine Clarke as Noelene Hogan
 Marny Kennedy as Young Noelene
 Ryan Corr as John Cornell
 Laura Gordon as Linda Kozlowski
 Nikki Osborne as Delvene Delaney
 Piéra Forde as Loren Hogan
 Lydia Mocerino as Jenny Hogan
 Chris Bartholomew as Wal
 Cameron Caulfield as Clag Hogan
 Vanessa Buckley as Alice
 Connor Zegenhagen as Michael

Reception

Viewership

References

Seven Network original programming
2010s Australian television miniseries
2017 Australian television series debuts
2017 Australian television series endings